This World, Then the Fireworks is a 1997 American crime drama film directed by Michael Oblowitz and starring Billy Zane, Gina Gershon and Sheryl Lee. The screenplay is based on a short story of the same name by Jim Thompson.

Plot
As children, Marty and Carol Lakewood, fraternal twins, witness a brutal murder involving their father. They grow up to become depraved and incestuous adults, living in coastal California in the mid-1950s.

Marty is a skillful journalist, but grows bored with every new job and is easily distracted. When he seduces a young police officer, Lois Archer, and discovers she owns a beach house, Marty sets out to double-cross her and make the property his own.

Carol is a heartless prostitute, willing to go to any lengths to con men out of their money, or make them pay in other ways. Powerless to stop them is Mrs. Lakewood, a weak-willed woman who suspects the terrible truth in her children's relationship, but knows no way to stop it.

Cast
 Billy Zane as Marty
Christopher Jones as Young Marty
Christian Durango as Little Marty
 Gina Gershon as Carol
Megan Leigh Brown as Young Carol
Sloan Cobb as Little Carol
 Sheryl Lee as Lois
 Rue McClanahan as Mrs. Lakewood
Roberta Hanley as Young Mrs. Lakewood
 Seymour Cassel as Detective Harris
 Will Patton as Lieutenant Morgan
 Richard Edson as Joe
 Tom Keeley as Lyle
 William Hootkins as Jake Krutz
 Philip Loch as Marty Lakewood's Father
 Elis Imboden as neighbor's Wife
 Mark Jeffrey Miller as Lloyd
 Marianna Alacchi as Glenda
 Robert Pentz as Lou
 Orson Oblowitz as Eugene
 Thad Mace as Tim
 Jonathan Taylor Luthren as Ben
 Stephanie Fisher as Claire
 Lou Criscuolo as McCloud
 Jeffrey Pillars as Galloway
 John Bennes as Griffith
 Barry Bell as Barnett Gibons
 David Lenthall as Doctor
 Terry Nienhuis as Minister
 Valentin de Vargas as Mexican Doctor
 Dean Mumford as Marine
 Willy Cobbs as Blues Musician
 Brian Keith Gamble as Spindly Man
 Mert Hatfield as Bus Driver
 Matt O'Toole as Thug 1
 Norman Max Maxwell as Thug 2

Reception and release
On review aggregator website Rotten Tomatoes, the film has a 38% approval rating based on 8 reviews, with an average ranking of 3.9/10.

Emanuel Levy of Variety wrote "In the hands of filmmaker Michael Oblowitz, novelist Jim Thompson's story "This World, Then the Fireworks" gets an elegantly stylish, highly erotic, intentionally over-the-top rendition".

Total Film called the film "sexy, stylized, deliberately overheated slice of noir".

On November 14, 2017, Kino Lorber released a Blu-ray of the film.

References

External links

1997 crime drama films
American crime drama films
American neo-noir films
Films about twins
Films based on Jim Thompson novels
Films set in the 1950s
Films shot in North Carolina
Incest in film
Largo Entertainment films
Films directed by Michael Oblowitz
1990s English-language films
1990s American films